Clavulina amazonensis is a species of fungus in the family Clavulinaceae. Found in South America (Venezuela, Brazil, and Guyana), it was described by British mycologist E.J.H. Corner in 1970.

References

External links

Fungi described in 1970
Fungi of South America
amazonensis